The All-China Gaelic games is a Gaelic games tournament held annually in China between club teams under the auspices of the Gaelic Athletic Association (GAA) and the Asian County Board (ACB). The Asian County Board of the Gaelic Athletic Association (GAA), is one of the county boards of the GAA set up and running outside the island of Ireland. This county board is responsible for Gaelic games across Asia-Pacific Region, other than Australia and New Zealand (which fall under the Australasia GAA board).

The annual tournament is a one-day event, with both men's and ladies' teams competing in Gaelic football. The tournament is the highlight of the mid-season for the Gaelic Athletic Association Clubs in mainland China. Exhibition games have also been held in International (compromised) rules and Hurling during the event.

History
The All-China Games began in 2002, and feature GAA teams from across China, such as the 
Shanghai Gaelic Athletic Association, the Hong Kong Gaelic Athletic Association and the Beijing Gaelic Athletic Association. After being cancelled in 2003 due to the outbreak of SARS, they returned in 2004.

In April 2012 it was decided by the Beijing Gaelic Athletic Association to host the 2012 All-China Games as part of the 10th Anniversary celebration of Beijing GAA. Beijing GAA hosted the 2012 North Asian Games from June 8–10, 2012. It was the first year that the previous All-Asia games are being expanded to include participants from across northern Asia. Beijing invited teams from various Chinese cities, such as Shanghai, Shenzhen, Dalian and Suzhou and for the first time, also invited teams from Taiwan, Korea and Japan.

Participants
Teams sanctioned by the Asian GAA can participate in the competition. As of 2012, Chinese based teams included Beijing GAA, Canton Celts, Dalian Wolfhounds, Hong Kong GAA, Shanghai Gaelic Football Club, Shenzhen Celts and Suzhou Eire Og.

Participant players in the competition are primarily Irish diaspora, but they also draw participants from other countries (including China) who learn the sport. For example, players from 22 separate nations competed in the 2005 All-China Gaelic games.

The cumulative top competition winners in the competition to date have been Hong Kong (9) and Shanghai (7).

All China Games - A Competition Winners

All China Games - Non-A Competition Winners

All China Games - Most Valuable Players

References

External links
 Beijing GAA club - 2005 competition hosts
 AsianCountyBoard.com report
 AGB All China Games Roll of Honour
 Beijing GAA Chairman Colin Dixon takes about the 10th All China Games

Gaelic Athletic Association competitions
Asia GAA
2002 establishments in China
Gaelic Games